Galen E. Dreibelbis  (born January 3, 1935) is a former Democratic member of the Pennsylvania House of Representatives.

Biography
Dreibelbis, a lifelong State College resident, is a commercial and residential real estate developer. He served three terms in the Pennsylvania Legislature (1971–76) before retiring to devote full-time to managing Nittany Gas and Oil Company, a firm which he founded in 1958 and sold in 1982, and other business interests.

Philanthropy
Dreibelbis and his wife Nancy, a Mifflin County native, have given generously to Penn State and Mount Nittany Medical Center.

References

Democratic Party members of the Pennsylvania House of Representatives
1935 births
Living people
People from State College, Pennsylvania